Eric Westroth (born 1971) is a Swedish businessman and politician for the Sweden Democrats who has served as a member of the Riksdag since 2018.

Westroth is a member of the Sweden Democrats district board and the party finance officer in Jönköping County. Westroth was elected to the Riksdag in 2018 and takes seat 126 for the Halland County constituency. In parliament, he serves as a deputy on the EU Committee and was the spokesman for both the Sweden Democrats and the European Conservatives and Reformists group at the  Stability, Economic Coordination and Governance in the European Union in Berlin 2020.

References 

People from Uppvidinge Municipality
1971 births
Living people
21st-century Swedish businesspeople
Members of the Riksdag 2018–2022
Members of the Riksdag from the Sweden Democrats
Members of the Riksdag 2022–2026